This Time I Almost Made It is the third solo studio album released by American country singer, Barbara Mandrell, released in 1974.

This would be Mandrell's last album with record company Columbia before the label dropped her. She would later switch to ABC/Dot and enjoy the most successful part of her career under the record company. This album spawned two singles that charted on the Hot Country Singles & Tracks chart. The first single, the title track peaked at #12. The second single, "Wonder When My Baby's Coming Home" barely cracked the Top 40, peaking at only #39. The album only reached #41 on the Top Country Albums chart.

In 2016, an expanded version of the album was released on CD, containing the bonus tracks listed below.

Track listing
"This Time I Almost Made It" (Billy Sherrill)
"Right Back Feeling Like a Woman" (Sherrill, Jerry Chesnut)
"Wisdom of a Fool" (Roy Alfred, Abner Silver)
"You're All I Need to Get By" (Nickolas Ashford, Valerie Simpson)
"Wonder When My Baby's Coming Home" (Kermit Goell, Arthur Kent)
"Keep On Singing" (Danny Janssen, Bobby Hart)
"A Very Special Love Song" (Sherrill, Norro Wilson)
"Today I Started Loving You Again" (Merle Haggard, Bonnie Owens)
"Kiss the Hurt Away" (Finley Duncan, Chuck Reed)
"Words" (Barry Gibb, Maurice Gibb, Robin Gibb)
"Something" (George Harrison)

Bonus tracks
"I Hope You Love Me" (George Jones, Tammy Wynette)
"You Can Always Come Back" (Curly Putman)
"Coming Home Soldier" (Bobby Vinton, Gene Allan)
"Stay There Till I Get There" (Glenn Sutton)
"I Take It Back" (Perry Buie, James Cobb)
"Dim Lights, Thick Smoke (And Loud, Loud Music)" (Joe Maphis, Rose Lee Maphis, Max Fidler)
"You Took Him Off My Hands" (Harlan Howard, Wynn Stewart, Skeets McDonald)
"Son-Of-A-Gun" (Toni Dae, Bobbi Odom)
"Scarlet Water" (Freddy Weller, Spooner Oldham)

Charts
Album – Billboard (North America)

Singles – Billboard (North America)

1974 albums
Barbara Mandrell albums
Albums produced by Billy Sherrill
Columbia Records albums